Get With Me is the second studio album to be released by the R&B and hip hop group 3rd Storee, released on April 16, 2002 by Universal. The leading single track of the album "Get With Me", also features rapper Joe Budden The soulful ballad "I'm Sorry" was featured on the Rush Hour 2 soundtrack. "Superstar" was marketed as another single on the album's packaging promotion however didn't reach commercial success.

Critical reception

Vibe writer Laura Checkoway commended the production and the group's vocals but felt the tracks carried "underdeveloped lyrics" and chorus that were "more irritating than infectious", concluding that, "Even if you're a sucker for sweet faces, mindless melodies, and polished production, this album is less than the sum of its parts."

Track listing

References

2002 albums
3rd Storee albums
Albums produced by the Underdogs (production team)